KCHL (1480 AM) is an urban gospel radio station based in San Antonio, Texas.

History
KCHL's format history includes Urban Contemporary (or Soul) as KAPE from the mid 60's to 1990. The station later changed its call letters to KCHL and flipped to an Urban Gospel format that still airs to this day.

External links

CHL
Gospel radio stations in the United States